Olena Anatolyevna Antonova (born 16 June 1972) is a Ukrainian former discus thrower. She was born in Nikopol.

Career
Antonova's personal best throw is 67.30 metres, achieved in June 2004 in Kyiv. She won the bronze medal in Women's discus throw at the 2008 Summer Olympics in Beijing, upgraded to silver later.

Already in retirement, Antonova was suspended from competition for two years in July 2013, after a re-tested doping sample from the 2009 world championships proved positive for stanozolol.

Achievements

References

 

1972 births
Living people
Ukrainian female discus throwers
Athletes (track and field) at the 1996 Summer Olympics
Athletes (track and field) at the 2000 Summer Olympics
Athletes (track and field) at the 2004 Summer Olympics
Athletes (track and field) at the 2008 Summer Olympics
Olympic athletes of Ukraine
Olympic silver medalists for Ukraine
Medalists at the 2008 Summer Olympics
Doping cases in athletics
Ukrainian sportspeople in doping cases
Olympic silver medalists in athletics (track and field)
People from Nikopol, Ukraine
Sportspeople from Dnipropetrovsk Oblast
20th-century Ukrainian women
21st-century Ukrainian women